In mathematics, the degree of an affine or projective variety of dimension  is the number of intersection points of the variety
with  hyperplanes in general position. For an algebraic set, the intersection points must be counted with their intersection multiplicity, because of the possibility of multiple components. For (irreducible) varieties, if one takes into account the multiplicities and, in the affine case, the points at infinity, the hypothesis of general position may be replaced by the much weaker condition that the intersection of the variety has the dimension zero (that is, consists of a finite number of points). This is a generalization of Bézout's theorem (For a proof, see ).

The degree is not an intrinsic property of the variety, as it depends on a specific embedding of the variety in an affine or projective space.

The degree of a hypersurface is equal to the total degree of its defining equation. A generalization of Bézout's theorem asserts that, if an intersection of   projective hypersurfaces has codimension  , then the degree of the intersection is the product of the degrees of the hypersurfaces.

It follows that, given the equations of the variety, the degree may be computed from a Gröbner basis of the ideal of these equations.

Definition
For V embedded in a projective space Pn and defined over some algebraically closed field K, the degree d of V is the number of points of intersection of V, defined over K, with a linear subspace L in general position, such that

Here dim(V) is the dimension of V, and the codimension of L will be equal to that dimension. The degree d is an extrinsic quantity, and not intrinsic as a property of V. For example, the projective line has an (essentially unique) embedding of degree n in Pn.

Properties
The degree of a hypersurface F = 0 is the same as the total degree of the homogeneous polynomial F defining it (granted, in case F has repeated factors, that intersection theory is used to count intersections with multiplicity, as in Bézout's theorem).

Other approaches
For a more sophisticated approach, the linear system of divisors defining the embedding of V can be related to the line bundle or invertible sheaf defining the embedding by its space of sections. The tautological line bundle on Pn pulls back to V. The degree determines the first Chern class. The degree can also be computed in the cohomology ring of Pn, or Chow ring, with the class of a hyperplane intersecting the class of V an appropriate number of times.

Extending Bézout's theorem
The degree can be used to generalize Bézout's theorem in an expected way to intersections of n hypersurfaces in Pn.

Notes

Algebraic varieties